The 2016 Angelique Kerber tennis season officially began on 5 January with the start of the 2016 Brisbane International. Kerber entered the season as the number 10 ranked player and the defending champion at four tournaments.

Year in detail

Australian Open Series

Australian Open
Kerber entered the 2016 Australian Open as the seventh seed. She saved a match point in the second set against Misaki Doi in the first round before defeating her in three sets to advance to the second round. Following this tight encounter, Kerber defeated Alexandra Dulgheru, Madison Brengle, and compatriot Annika Beck all in comprehensive straight sets to advance to the quarterfinals, her first in Melbourne, where she faced her nemesis Victoria Azarenka, in a rematch of their encounter in Brisbane. With new tactics, Kerber assailed to a lead by two breaks in the first set. Azarenka then fought her way back into the set, but Kerber maintained a one-break lead to close out the set. In the second set, Azarenka resumed her comeback and served for the set twice, but Kerber broke Azarenka both times and had to save four set points in the process too. She ultimately took the match, thus beating Azarenka for the first time in her career, and advanced to her third career Grand Slam semifinal, the most recent one having come in Wimbledon back in 2012.

In the semifinals, Kerber faced the unseeded Johanna Konta and saw off the Briton in straight sets to book a spot in her maiden Grand Slam final, a meeting against world No. 1 and defending champion Serena Williams, who had been in dominant form. There, Kerber surprised Williams in a spectacular match where she was the underdog, and defeated Williams, 4–6, 6–3, 4–6, also stopping Williams from equaling the Open Era record held by Steffi Graf.

With the title, Kerber became the first major champion to save a match point in the first round. She was also the first German of any gender to win a major since Graf at the 1999 French Open. Kerber's victory catapulted her ranking to No.2 for the first time in her career.

All matches

Singles matches

Doubles matches

Tournament schedule

Singles schedule
Kerber's 2016 singles tournament schedule is as follows:

Yearly records

Head-to-head matchups
(Bold denotes a top 10 player at the time of the most recent match between the two players, Italic denotes top 50; for players whose ranking changed over the course of the year, see the note for a more complete breakdown by ranking.)

Finals

Singles: 8 (3–5)

Doubles: 1 (0–1)

Earnings

 Figures in United States dollars (USD) unless noted. 

 Bold denotes tournament win

See also
 2016 WTA Tour
 2016 Serena Williams tennis season
 Angelique Kerber career statistics

Notes

References

External links

 Official website 
 Angelique Kerber at the Women's Tennis Association
 Angelique Kerber at the International Tennis Federation
 Angelique Kerber at the Fed Cup
 Angelique Kerber at the International Olympic Committee

Angelique Kerber tennis seasons
Kerber
Kerber